The 1974 Kansas gubernatorial election was held on November 5, 1974. Republican nominee Robert Frederick Bennett narrowly defeated Democratic nominee Vern Miller with 49.5% of the vote.

, this marks the last occasion in which the following counties have voted Democratic in a gubernatorial election: Clark, Morton, Seward, Stanton, and Stevens.

Primary elections
Primary elections were held on August 6, 1974.

Republican primary

Candidates
Robert Frederick Bennett, President of the Kansas Senate
Don O. Concannon, Former President of the Kansas Republican Party
Forrest J. Robinson, former minister of the First United Methodist Church of Wichita
Bob Clack

Results

General election

Candidates
Major party candidates
Robert Frederick Bennett, Republican 
Vern Miller, Democratic

Other candidates
Marshall Uncapher, Prohibition

Results

References

1974
Kansas
Gubernatorial